Haynes Inlet Bridge (or Haynes Inlet Slough Bridge) is a bridge that carries U.S. Route 101 (US 101) over Haynes Inlet.

The arches are cast in place and post-tensioned.

See also
 
 
 
 List of bridges on U.S. Route 101 in Oregon

References

External links

2004 establishments in Oregon
Bridges completed in 2004
Bridges of the United States Numbered Highway System
Transportation buildings and structures in Coos County, Oregon
Road bridges in Oregon
U.S. Route 101
North Bend, Oregon
Concrete bridges in the United States